Marko Carrillo (born 4 July 1988) is a Peruvian sports shooter. He competed in the men's 10 metre air pistol event at the 2016 Summer Olympics.

References

External links
 

1988 births
Living people
Peruvian male sport shooters
Olympic shooters of Peru
Shooters at the 2016 Summer Olympics
Shooters at the 2020 Summer Olympics
Place of birth missing (living people)
Pan American Games medalists in shooting
Pan American Games bronze medalists for Peru
Shooters at the 2015 Pan American Games
South American Games gold medalists for Peru
South American Games silver medalists for Peru
South American Games medalists in shooting
Competitors at the 2018 South American Games
Shooters at the 2019 Pan American Games
Medalists at the 2015 Pan American Games
Medalists at the 2019 Pan American Games
21st-century Peruvian people